Love Scenes may refer to:

 Love Scenes (Diana Krall album), 1997
 Love Scenes (Beverley Craven album), 1993
 "Love Scenes" (song), a 1993 song by Beverley Craven